Professor Abdullah Magsi (Urdu:عبدالله مگسی) (Sindhi: عبدالله مگسي) (b. 17 December 1947, d.1 April 1993) was a Pakistani author and professor from Sindh Pakistan.

Early life
Abdullah Magsi was born to Dhani Bux Magsi on 17 December 1947, at Village Gul Muhammad Magsi, Dadu District, Sindh. Through Sindh Public Service Commission he was appointed lecturer in Political Science and got promotion as professor.

Contribution
He wrote many articles about history of Sindh but his book 'Sindh Ji Tareekh Jo Jadeed Mutalio' is his countable contribution. Abdullah Magsi mostly wrote about the neglected and unexplored heritage of the Dadu District including Sindh.

Death
Magsi died on 1 April 1993.

References 

Sindhi-language writers
Writers from Sindh
1947 births
1993 deaths